Rohan Dennis (born 28 May 1990) is an Australian professional road racing cyclist who currently rides for UCI WorldTeam . Dennis was born, raised, and resides in Adelaide, Australia. He won back to back UCI men's individual time trial world championships in 2018 and 2019.

Career

Early career
Dennis began his career by focusing on the track, and was part of the Australian team that took the silver medals in the team pursuit at the 2012 Summer Olympics.

Garmin–Sharp (2013–14)
He joined  for the 2013 season, and made his debut at the Tour de France, pulling out of the race before Stage 9.

In 2014, Dennis finished second overall behind Bradley Wiggins at the Tour of California, after placing second to Wiggins in the time trial. He also placed second in the Commonwealth Games time trial behind England's Alex Dowsett.

BMC Racing Team (2014–18)
He went on to win the World team time trial championships with his new team.

The record stood until 2 May 2015, when it was broken by Dowsett. Dennis was selected to ride the Tour de France as part of the  squad supporting Tejay van Garderen. With this performance, he established a new record average speed for an individual time trial at the Tour de France. He won the Sir Hubert Opperman medal and trophy for Australia's best all-round cyclist in 2015.

He was named in the start list for the 2017 Giro d'Italia, however he abandoned the race on the 4th stage after injuries due to a crash on stage 2. Subsequently, at the 2017 Vuelta a España, Dennis crossed the line first as part of the BMC squad that won the race's opening team time trial, taking the race leader's red jersey and becoming the first Australian to lead the race since Michael Matthews in 2014.

At the 2018 Giro d'Italia, Dennis was narrowly defeated in the opening time trial by Tom Dumoulin. However, he took the pink jersey on the second stage by picking up a time bonus in an intermediate sprint. In doing so, he became the first Australian to lead the Giro since Simon Clarke in 2015, and the third Australian to wear the leader's jersey in all three Grand Tours, after Bradley McGee and Cadel Evans. He went on to win the stage 16 time trial and finished the race in 16th place overall, 56 minutes and 7 seconds down on winner Chris Froome.

When he won the first stage at the 2018 Vuelta a España he became the 95th rider in history to have won at least one stage in all three Grand Tours, and the 15th rider to have won an individual time trial at each Grand Tour. He went on to win the stage 16 time trial, and left the Vuelta immediately after to prepare for the World Championships in Innsbruck, winning the individual time trial title by over a minute ahead of defending champion Tom Dumoulin of the Netherlands. He also helped his BMC team win the bronze medal in the team time trial event.

At the end of 2018, he won two major Australian awards: Australian Institute of Sport Performance Awards – Male Athlete of the Year and Cycling Australia's Sir Hubert Opperman Medal, which he had previously won in 2015.

Bahrain– (2019)
In August 2018, it was announced that Dennis would join  in 2019 on a two-year deal, making the move from BMC alongside team-mates Damiano Caruso and Dylan Teuns.

On 18 July 2019, he abandoned the Tour de France during Stage 12. No reason was immediately given, but later reports indicated that his abandonment was the result over frustration with equipment provided by the team. In an interview he subsequently gave in January 2020, Dennis stated that he left the Tour as his mental health was suffering due to difficulties with the team, and he feared that this would have a knock-on effect on his marriage.

On 25 September 2019, Dennis raced for the first time since abandoning the Tour de France, winning gold in the men's individual time trial at the Road World Championships in Yorkshire. Dennis rode an unmarked BMC bicycle during the World Championship time trial, rather than his trade Mérida machine. Several days later, his former team  confirmed that they had parted ways with Dennis on 13 September.

Team Ineos (2020–2021)
On 9 December 2019, it was announced that Dennis would be joining  for the 2020 season. The following month Dennis stated that he had abandoned his attempts to become a contender for the general classification in Grand Tours; instead, he would focus on smaller stage races and working as a domestique in the three-week races. In the 2020 Giro d'Italia, Dennis contributed greatly to his teammate Tao Geoghegan Hart's overall victory with impressive pulls on Stage 18 (Stelvio) and 20 (Sestriere). On the former stage, Dennis won the Cima Coppi award by being the first to reach the summit of the highest climb in the race, that being the Stelvio.

Team Jumbo–Visma (2022–present)
In his first race of the year, he won his fourth Australian National Time Trial Championships. He led the Tour de Romandie for four days, before dropping to eighth overall on the final individual time trial stage, having lost more than two minutes to eventual winner Aleksandr Vlasov. 
On 10 February 2023 Dennis announced his retirement from professional cycling by the end of the racing season.

Personal life
In May 2017 Dennis' partner, fellow racing cyclist Melissa Hoskins, announced the couple's engagement as well as her retirement from competition. They married in February 2018. Hoskins gave birth to their first child, a son, later that year, two and a half weeks after Dennis won his first World Time Trial Championship. The family split their time between Girona, La Massana and Adelaide.

Major results

Road

2007
 9th Time trial, UCI World Junior Championships
2010
 1st  Time trial, National Under-23 Championships
 3rd Overall Thüringen Rundfahrt der U23
1st Stage 1 (TTT)
 4th Overall Olympia's Tour
 5th Time trial, UCI World Under-23 Championships
 6th Time trial, Commonwealth Games
 10th Overall Ringerike GP
2011
 4th Road race, National Under-23 Championships
2012
 National Under-23 Championships
1st  Road race
1st  Time trial
 1st  Overall Thüringen Rundfahrt der U23
1st Stage 5 (ITT)
 1st Memorial Davide Fardelli
 1st Chrono Champenois
 2nd  Time trial, UCI World Under-23 Championships
 2nd Trofeo Alcide Degasperi
 4th Overall Olympia's Tour
1st Stage 5 (ITT)
 5th Overall Tour Down Under
1st  Mountains classification
1st  Young rider classification
 5th Trofeo Città di San Vendemiano
2013
 1st  Overall Tour of Alberta
1st  Young rider classification
1st Stage 3
 2nd Time trial, National Championships
 8th Overall Critérium du Dauphiné
1st  Young rider classification
2014
 UCI World Championships
1st  Team time trial
5th Time trial
 2nd  Time trial, Commonwealth Games
 2nd Overall Tour of California
1st Stage 3
 2nd Overall Circuit de la Sarthe
1st  Young rider classification
2015
 UCI World Championships
1st  Team time trial
6th Time trial
 1st  Overall Tour Down Under
1st  Young rider classification
1st Stage 3
 1st  Overall USA Pro Cycling Challenge
1st  Mountains classification
1st Stages 4 & 5 (ITT)
 Tour de France
1st Stages 1 (ITT) & 9 (TTT)
Held ,  &  after Stage 1
 1st Stage 3 (TTT) Critérium du Dauphiné
 2nd Time trial, National Championships
2016
 1st  Time trial, National Championships
 Eneco Tour
1st Stages 2 (ITT) & 5 (TTT)
 UCI World Championships
2nd  Team time trial
6th Time trial
 2nd Overall Tour of California
1st Stage 6 (ITT)
 2nd Overall Tour of Britain
1st Stage 7b
 5th Time trial, Olympic Games
2017
 1st  Time trial, National Championships
 1st  Overall Tour La Provence
1st  Points classification
 Vuelta a España
1st Stage 1 (TTT)
Held  after Stage 1
 Tour de Suisse
1st Stages 1 (ITT) & 9 (ITT)
 1st Stage 2 Tour of the Alps
 1st Stage 2 (TTT) Volta a Catalunya
 UCI World Championships
2nd  Team time trial
8th Time trial
 2nd Overall Tirreno–Adriatico
1st Stages 1 (TTT) & 7 (ITT)
 6th Overall Tour Down Under
2018
 UCI World Championships
1st  Time trial
3rd  Team time trial
 1st  Time trial, National Championships
 Vuelta a España
1st Stages 1 (ITT) & 16 (ITT)
Held ,  &  after Stage 1
 Giro d'Italia
1st Stage 16 (ITT)
Held  after Stages 2–5
 Tirreno–Adriatico
1st Stages 1 (TTT) & 7 (ITT)
 7th Overall Tour de Romandie
 9th Overall Abu Dhabi Tour
1st Stage 4 (ITT)
2019
 1st  Time trial, UCI World Championships
 2nd Time trial, National Championships
 2nd Overall Tour de Suisse
1st Stage 1 (ITT)
 5th Overall Tour Down Under
2020
 2nd Time trial, National Championships
 4th Overall Tour Down Under
 5th Time trial, UCI World Championships
2021
 1st Prologue Tour de Romandie
 1st Stage 2 (ITT) Volta a Catalunya
 3rd  Time trial, Olympic Games
 6th Overall Tour of Britain
1st Stage 3 (TTT)
2022
 1st  Time trial, Commonwealth Games
 1st  Time trial, National Championships
 1st Stage 1 (TTT) Vuelta a España
 8th Overall Tour de Romandie
2023
 1st Stage 2 Tour Down Under
 1st Stage 3 (TTT) Paris–Nice

General classification results timeline
Sources:

Major Championships timeline

Track

2007
 1st  Team pursuit, National Junior Championships
2008
 UCI World Junior Championships
1st  Team pursuit
2nd  Individual pursuit
 1st Team pursuit, UCI World Cup Classics, Melbourne
 National Junior Championships
1st  Individual pursuit
1st  Points
2009
 1st Team pursuit, UCI World Cup Classics, Beijing
 2nd  Team pursuit, UCI World Championships
 3rd Team pursuit, National Championships
2010
 1st  Team pursuit, UCI World Championships
 National Championships
1st  Team pursuit
2nd Individual pursuit
2011
 1st  Team pursuit, UCI World Championships
 1st Individual pursuit, UCI World Cup Classics, Manchester
 National Championships
1st  Team pursuit
2nd Individual pursuit
2012
 1st Team pursuit, UCI World Cup, London
 National Championships
1st  Team pursuit
2nd Individual pursuit
 2nd  Team pursuit, Olympic Games
 2nd  Team pursuit, UCI World Championships
2015
 World Hour record: 52.491 km

References

External links

 

 
 
 
 

Australian male cyclists
1990 births
Living people
UCI Road World Champions (elite men)
Australian Institute of Sport cyclists
Commonwealth Games silver medallists for Australia
Cyclists at the 2012 Summer Olympics
Cyclists at the 2016 Summer Olympics
Cyclists at the 2014 Commonwealth Games
Olympic cyclists of Australia
Olympic silver medalists for Australia
Olympic medalists in cycling
Cyclists at the 2010 Commonwealth Games
Medalists at the 2012 Summer Olympics
Cyclists from Adelaide
UCI Track Cycling World Champions (men)
Australian Tour de France stage winners
Commonwealth Games medallists in cycling
Australian track cyclists
Australian Vuelta a España stage winners
Australian Giro d'Italia stage winners
Olympic bronze medalists for Australia
Medalists at the 2020 Summer Olympics
Cyclists at the 2020 Summer Olympics
Tour de Suisse stage winners
20th-century Australian people
21st-century Australian people
Medallists at the 2014 Commonwealth Games